Allan Dell (born 16 March 1992) is a Scotland international rugby union player. He plays for Glasgow Warriors. He previously played for Edinburgh Rugby and London Irish. His usual position is prop.

Rugby Union career

Professional career

He made his debut in the 2012 Vodacom Cup game against . He made his Currie Cup debut in the same season against .

Dell signed for Edinburgh for the 2014–15 season. 

On 15 January 2019, it was announced that Dell would leave Edinburgh and join London Irish from the 2019–20 season.

He signed with Glasgow Warriors on 15 July 2022. A former Edinburgh player, Dell has experience of playing against the Warriors in the 1872 Cup. On his signing he stated:
It'll be nice to have the fans on my side, too! The crowd always gets stuck into you as the opposition and always get right behind their team, it's a brilliant atmosphere. I can't wait to be a part of it and get this club back to where it should be.

He made his competitive debut for Glasgow Warriors on 25 February 2023, coming off the bench in the match against the Lions in the United Rugby Championship. Dell earned the Glasgow Warrior No. 352.

International career

Dell qualifies for Scotland through his grandmother, Joan Carmichael, who was born in Paisley and brought up in Edinburgh.

He was a member of the victorious South Africa Under-20 team at the 2012 IRB Junior World Championship, including playing in the final against New Zealand Under-20.

Dell was called up to the senior Scotland squad by Vern Cotter in October 2016. He earned his first cap starting in the 2016 Autumn Internationals series against Australia.

Dell was called up to the 2017 British & Irish Lions tour to New Zealand as cover for the two final games against the provinces. 
He made one substitute appearance, becoming Lion number #834.

References

External links

1992 births
Living people
South African rugby union players
Sharks (Currie Cup) players
Rugby union props
People from Humansdorp
South African people of British descent
South Africa Under-20 international rugby union players
British & Irish Lions rugby union players from South Africa
Scotland international rugby union players
Rugby union players from the Eastern Cape
Scottish rugby union players
Edinburgh Rugby players
London Irish players
Glasgow Warriors players

Alumni of Queen's College Boys' High School